Atelopus sernai is a species of toad in the family Bufonidae.
It is endemic to the northern Andes of Colombia.
Its natural habitats include subtropical or tropical moist montane forests, subtropical or tropical high-altitude grassland, and rivers.
It is threatened by habitat loss.

Sources
 Rueda, J.V., Osorno-Muñoz, M., Ardila-Robayo, M.C., Maldonado-Silva, R.A., Bolívar, W., Castro, F. & Lynch, J. 2004.  Atelopus sernai.   2006 IUCN Red List of Threatened Species.   Downloaded on 21 July 2007.

References

sernai
Amphibians of Colombia
Endemic fauna of Colombia
Amphibians described in 1994
Taxonomy articles created by Polbot